Woodland Township is a township in Burlington County, in the U.S. state of New Jersey. As of the 2020 United States census, the township's population was 1,544, a decrease of 244 (−13.6%) from the 2010 census count of 1,788, which in turn reflected an increase of 618 (+52.8%) from the 1,170 counted in the 2000 Census.

Woodland was incorporated as a township by an act of the New Jersey Legislature on March 7, 1866, from portions of Pemberton Township, Shamong Township, Southampton Township and Washington Township. Portions of the township were taken to form Tabernacle Township on March 22, 1901.

History 
The area now known as Woodland Township was originally inhabited by the Lenape Native American tribe. European settlers began arriving in the late 17th century, attracted by the fertile soil and abundant lumber resources. The settlers cleared land for farming and built homes and other structures using local materials, including wood and sandstone.

Throughout the late 19th and early 20th centuries, Woodland was predominantly an agricultural community, with farming being the primary occupation for most residents. The fertile soil in the region was ideal for growing a variety of crops, including corn, wheat, and potatoes. In addition to crop farming, livestock, dairy, and poultry farming also played a significant role in the local economy.

In the early 20th century, several small-scale industries began to emerge in Woodland, including sawmills, gristmills, and blacksmith shops. These industries relied heavily on the local resources, such as timber and iron ore, and provided employment opportunities for the residents.

In the latter half of the 20th century, Woodland experienced a shift away from agriculture and towards a more diversified economy. Although farming remained an important aspect of the township's identity, the focus shifted to include manufacturing, retail, and service-based industries. This transition allowed the community to adapt to the changing economic landscape and maintain stability.

Today, Woodland is a vibrant and diverse community that retains its small-town charm and rural character. The township boasts a mix of residential, commercial, and agricultural areas, reflecting its multifaceted history. Woodland is known for its picturesque landscapes, including the scenic Brendan T. Byrne State Forest, which offers numerous recreational opportunities such as hiking, camping, and birdwatching.

Geography
According to the U.S. Census Bureau, the township had a total area of 94.45 square miles (244.61 km2), including 92.64 square miles (239.93 km2) of land and 1.81 square miles (4.68 km2) of water (1.91%).

The township borders Bass River Township, Pemberton Township, Southampton Township, Tabernacle Township, Washington Township in Burlington County; and Barnegat Township, Lacey Township, Little Egg Harbor Township and Manchester Township in Ocean County.

Unincorporated communities, localities and place names located partially or completely within the township include Bullock, Butlers Place, Chatsworth (the postal address for most of the residents of the township), DeCou Pond, Dukes Bridge, Four Mile, Goose Pond, Hedger House, Johnson Place, Jones Mill, Lebanon, Long Causeway, Old Halfway, South Park and Woodmansie.

The township is one of 56 South Jersey municipalities that are included within the New Jersey Pinelands National Reserve, a protected natural area of unique ecology covering , that has been classified as a United States Biosphere Reserve and established by Congress in 1978 as the nation's first National Reserve. All of the township is included in the state-designated Pinelands Area, which includes portions of Burlington County, along with areas in Atlantic, Camden, Cape May, Cumberland, Gloucester and Ocean counties.

Demographics

2010 census

The Census Bureau's 2006–2010 American Community Survey showed that (in 2010 inflation-adjusted dollars) median household income was $65,568 (with a margin of error of +/− $16,290) and the median family income was $96,875 (+/− $31,126). Males had a median income of $61,250 (+/− $11,359) versus $33,393 (+/− $4,757) for females. The per capita income for the borough was $33,552 (+/− $5,866). About 4.9% of families and 4.6% of the population were below the poverty line, including 8.6% of those under age 18 and 9.7% of those age 65 or over.

2000 census
As of the 2000 United States census there were 1,170 people, 425 households, and 323 families residing in the township.  The population density was 12.2 people per square mile (4.7/km2).  There were 448 housing units at an average density of 4.7 per square mile (1.8/km2).  The racial makeup of the township was 98.03% White, 0.60% African American, 0.09% Native American, 0.34% Asian, 0.17% from other races, and 0.77% from two or more races. Hispanic or Latino of any race were 1.20% of the population.

There were 425 households, out of which 35.1% had children under the age of 18 living with them, 60.5% were married couples living together, 8.9% had a female householder with no husband present, and 24.0% were non-families. 19.1% of all households were made up of individuals, and 5.2% had someone living alone who was 65 years of age or older. The average household size was 2.75 and the average family size was 3.15.

In the township the population was spread out, with 25.8% under the age of 18, 7.3% from 18 to 24, 31.3% from 25 to 44, 27.9% from 45 to 64, and 7.7% who were 65 years of age or older. The median age was 38 years. For every 100 females, there were 99.0 males.  For every 100 females age 18 and over, there were 101.9 males.

The median income for a household in the township was $59,271, and the median income for a family was $65,972. Males had a median income of $43,654 versus $31,765 for females. The per capita income for the township was $26,126. About 2.0% of families and 2.9% of the population were below the poverty line, including 2.9% of those under age 18 and 4.0% of those age 65 or over.

Government

Local government 
Woodland Township is governed under the Township form of New Jersey municipal government, one of 141 municipalities (of the 564) statewide that use this form, the second-most commonly used form of government in the state. The governing body is comprised of a three-member Township Committee, whose members are elected directly by the voters at-large in partisan elections to serve three-year terms of office on a staggered basis, with one seat coming up for election each year as part of the November general election in a three-year cycle. At an annual reorganization meeting, the Township Committee selects one of its members to serve as Mayor and another to serve as deputy mayor.

, the members of the Woodland Township Committee are Mayor William DeGroff (R, term on committee ends December 31, 2023; terms as mayor ends 2022), Deputy Mayor Mark J. Herndon (R, term on committee ends 2024; term as deputy mayor ends 2022) and Donna Mull (R, 2022; appointed to fill an unexpired term).

In May 2022, Donna Mull was appointed to fill the seat expiring in December 2022 that had been held by Derrick Daniels until he resigned from office after moving out of Woodland Township.

Federal, state and county representation 
Woodland Township is located in the 3rd Congressional District and is part of New Jersey's 8th state legislative district.

 

Burlington County is governed by a Board of County Commissioners comprised of five members who are chosen at-large in partisan elections to serve three-year terms of office on a staggered basis, with either one or two seats coming up for election each year; at an annual reorganization meeting, the board selects a director and deputy director from among its members to serve a one-year term. , Burlington County's Commissioners are
Director Felicia Hopson (D, Willingboro Township, term as commissioner ends December 31, 2024; term as director ends 2023),
Deputy Director Tom Pullion (D, Edgewater Park, term as commissioner and as deputy director ends 2023),
Allison Eckel (D, Medford, 2025),
Daniel J. O'Connell (D, Delran Township, 2024) and 
Balvir Singh (D, Burlington Township, 2023). 
Burlington County's Constitutional Officers are
County Clerk Joanne Schwartz (R, Southampton Township, 2023)
Sheriff James H. Kostoplis (D, Bordentown, 2025) and 
Surrogate Brian J. Carlin (D, Burlington Township, 2026).

Politics
As of March 2011, there were a total of 947 registered voters in Woodland Township, of which 153 (16.2% vs. 33.3% countywide) were registered as Democrats, 394 (41.6% vs. 23.9%) were registered as Republicans and 400 (42.2% vs. 42.8%) were registered as Unaffiliated. There were no voters registered to other parties. Among the township's 2010 Census population, 53.0% (vs. 61.7% in Burlington County) were registered to vote, including 66.4% of those ages 18 and over (vs. 80.3% countywide).

In the 2012 presidential election, Republican Mitt Romney received 379 votes here (57.0% vs. 40.2% countywide), ahead of Democrat Barack Obama with 275 votes (41.4% vs. 58.1%) and other candidates with 6 votes (0.9% vs. 1.0%), among the 665 ballots cast by the township's 962 registered voters, for a turnout of 69.1% (vs. 74.5% in Burlington County). In the 2008 presidential election, Republican John McCain received 396 votes here (55.4% vs. 39.9% countywide), ahead of Democrat Barack Obama with 300 votes (42.0% vs. 58.4%) and other candidates with 12 votes (1.7% vs. 1.0%), among the 715 ballots cast by the township's 953 registered voters, for a turnout of 75.0% (vs. 80.0% in Burlington County). In the 2004 presidential election, Republican George W. Bush received 351 votes here (57.0% vs. 46.0% countywide), ahead of Democrat John Kerry with 254 votes (41.2% vs. 52.9%) and other candidates with 8 votes (1.3% vs. 0.8%), among the 616 ballots cast by the township's 874 registered voters, for a turnout of 70.5% (vs. 78.8% in the whole county).

In the 2013 gubernatorial election, Republican Chris Christie received 310 votes here (70.6% vs. 61.4% countywide), ahead of Democrat Barbara Buono with 107 votes (24.4% vs. 35.8%) and other candidates with 8 votes (1.8% vs. 1.2%), among the 439 ballots cast by the township's 977 registered voters, yielding a 44.9% turnout (vs. 44.5% in the county). In the 2009 gubernatorial election, Republican Chris Christie received 307 votes here (60.9% vs. 47.7% countywide), ahead of Democrat Jon Corzine with 160 votes (31.7% vs. 44.5%), Independent Chris Daggett with 28 votes (5.6% vs. 4.8%) and other candidates with 5 votes (1.0% vs. 1.2%), among the 504 ballots cast by the township's 950 registered voters, yielding a 53.1% turnout (vs. 44.9% in the county).

Education 
The Woodland Township School District serves students in pre-kindergarten through eighth grade at Chatsworth Elementary School. As of the 2020–21 school year, the district, comprised of one school, had an enrollment of 120 students and 16.8 classroom teachers (on an FTE basis), for a student–teacher ratio of 7.1:1. In the 2016–2017 school year, Woodland had the 24th smallest enrollment of any school district in the state, with 147 students.

Public school students from Woodland Township in ninth through twelfth grades attend Seneca High School, located in Tabernacle Township, which also serves students from Shamong Township,  Southampton Township and Tabernacle Townships. The school is part of the Lenape Regional High School District, which also serves students from Evesham Township, Medford Lakes, Medford Township and Mount Laurel Township at Shawnee High School. As of the 2020–21 school year, the high school had an enrollment of 1,073 students and 103.6 classroom teachers (on an FTE basis), for a student–teacher ratio of 10.4:1.

Students from Woodland Township, and from all of Burlington County, are eligible to attend the Burlington County Institute of Technology, a countywide public school district that serves the vocational and technical education needs of students at the high school and post-secondary level at its campuses in Medford and Westampton.

Transportation

Two major state routes and two additional significant county routes pass through Woodland Township. Route 70 runs along the northwestern border while Route 72 travels from the northwest to the southeast. CR 532 and CR 563 also pass through and intersect with each other in Chatsworth. Four Mile Circle is a traffic circle located at the junction of Route 70, Route 72, Buddtown Road (County Route 644), and New Lisbon Road (County Route 646).

The Garden State Parkway is the closest limited-access highway. It is accessible via neighboring Lacey, Barnegat, Stafford, Little Egg Harbor and Bass River Townships.

References

External links

Municipal website
Woodland Township School District

School Data for the Woodland Township School District, National Center for Education Statistics
Lenape Regional High School District

 
1866 establishments in New Jersey
Populated places in the Pine Barrens (New Jersey)
Populated places established in 1866
Township form of New Jersey government
Townships in Burlington County, New Jersey